Dr. Michael Simon (1901–1976) was an Israeli diplomat who served as Ambassador to Peru and Minister to Bolivia (1960-1963); Austria (1963 - 1967) (at the same time, he was Ambassador to the United Nations & the OSCE in Vienna and was Consul General to Montreal from 1957 until 1960.

Biography
Simon was born in Berlin, settling in Palestine in 1924.  From 1948 until 1957, he was the head of the Protocol Division at the Ministry of Foreign Affairs.

References

Israeli consuls
Ambassadors of Israel to Canada
Ambassadors of Israel to Peru
Ambassadors of Israel to Bolivia
Ambassadors of Israel to Austria
1901 births
1976 deaths